General elections were held in Romania in July 1932. The Chamber of Deputies was elected on 17 July, whilst the Senate was elected in three stages on 20, 24 and 26 July. The result was a victory for the governing National Peasants' Party-German Party alliance, which won 274 of the 387 seats in the Chamber of Deputies and 104 of the 113 seats in the Senate elected through universal male vote. Of the 274 Chamber seats, 265 were taken by the National Peasant's Party and nine by the German Party.

Results

Chamber of Deputies

Senate

Notes

References

Parliamentary elections in Romania
Romania
Election and referendum articles with incomplete results
Romania
General